Epermenia sugisimai is a moth of the family Epermeniidae. It is endemic to Hokkaido, Japan.

The forewings are whitish and the hindwings are pale greyish-fuscous.

Etymology
The species is named in honour of Mr. Kazuhiro Sugisima, who collected the holotype.

References

External links

Moths described in 2006
Endemic fauna of Japan
Moths of Japan
Eucosmini